Functional data analysis (FDA) is a branch of statistics that analyses data providing information about curves, surfaces or anything else varying over a continuum.  In its most general form, under an FDA framework, each sample element of functional data is considered to be a random function. The physical continuum over which these functions are defined is often time, but may also be spatial location, wavelength, probability, etc. Intrinsically, functional data are infinite dimensional. The high intrinsic dimensionality of these data brings challenges for theory as well as computation, where these challenges vary with how the functional data were sampled. However, the high or infinite dimensional structure of the data is a rich source of information and there are many interesting challenges for research and data analysis.

History
Functional data analysis has roots going back to work by Grenander and Karhunen in the 1940s and 1950s. They considered the decomposition of square-integrable continuous time stochastic process into eigencomponents, now known as the Karhunen-Loève decomposition. A rigorous analysis of functional principal components analysis was done in the 1970s by Kleffe, Dauxois and Pousse including results about the asymptotic distribution of the eigenvalues. More recently in the 1990s and 2000s the field has focused more on applications and understanding the effects of dense and sparse observations schemes. The term "Functional Data Analysis" was coined by James O. Ramsay.

Mathematical formalism
Random functions can be viewed as random elements taking values in a Hilbert space, or as a stochastic process.  The former is mathematically convenient, whereas the latter is somewhat more suitable from an applied perspective.  These two approaches coincide if the random functions are continuous and a condition called mean-squared continuity is satisfied.

Hilbertian random variables

In the Hilbert space viewpoint, one considers an -valued random element , where  is a separable Hilbert space such as the space of square-integrable functions .
  
This formulation is the Pettis integral but the mean can also be defined as Bochner integral .
 
or, in tensor form, .  The spectral theorem allows to decompose  as the Karhunen-Loève decomposition
  
Truncating this infinite series to a finite order underpins functional principal component analysis.

Stochastic processes
The Hilbertian point of view is mathematically convenient, but abstract; the above considerations do not necessarily even view  as a function at all, since common choices of  like  and Sobolev spaces consist of equivalence classes, not functions.  The stochastic process perspective views  as a collection of random variables

indexed by the unit interval (or more generally interval ).  The mean and covariance functions are defined in a pointwise manner as

(if  for all ). 

Mercer's theorem then states that

Continuity of sample paths can be shown using Kolmogorov continuity theorem.

Functional data designs 
Functional data are considered as realizations of a stochastic process  that is an  process on a bounded and closed interval  with mean function  and covariance function .

1. Fully observed functions without noise at arbitrarily dense grid 
Measurements  available for all 

Often unrealistic but mathematically convenient.

Real life example: Tecator spectral data.

2. Densely sampled functions with noisy measurements (dense design) 
Measurements , where  are recorded on a regular grid,

, and  applies to typical functional data.

Real life example: Berkeley Growth Study Data and Stock data

3. Sparsely sampled functions with noisy measurements (longitudinal data)  

Real life example: CD4 count data for AIDS patients.

Functional principal component analysis

Functional principal component analysis (FPCA) is the most prevalent tool in FDA, partly because FPCA facilitates dimension reduction of the inherently infinite-dimensional functional data to finite-dimensional random vector of scores.

Important applications of FPCA include the modes of variation and functional principal component regression.

Functional linear regression models
Functional linear models can be viewed as an extension of the traditional multivariate linear models that associates vector responses with vector covariates. Functional linear models can be divided into two types based on the responses.

Functional regression models with scalar response
Models and  have been studied extensively.

Functional regression models with functional response
Two major models have been considered in this setup. Model has been studied extensively.

Function-on-scalar regression 
In particular, taking  as a constant function yields a special case of modelwhich is a functional linear model with functional responses and scalar covariates.

Concurrent regression models 
This model assumes that the value of  depends on the current value of  only and not the history  or future value. Hence, it is a "concurrent regression model", which is also referred as "varying-coefficient" model. Further, various estimation methods have been proposed.

Functional nonlinear regression models 
Direct nonlinear extensions of the classical functional linear regression models (FLMs) still involve a linear predictor, but combine it with a nonlinear link function, analogous to the idea of generalized linear model from the conventional linear model. Developments towards fully nonparametric regression models for functional data encounter problems such as curse of dimensionality. In order to bypass the "curse" and the metric selection problem, we are motivated to consider nonlinear functional regression models, which are subject to some structural constraints but do not overly infringe flexibility. One desires models that retain polynomial rates of convergence, while being more flexible than, say, functional linear models. Such models are particularly useful when diagnostics for the functional linear model indicate lack of fit, which is often encountered in real life situations.  In particular, functional polynomial models, functional single and multiple index models and functional additive models are three special cases of functional nonlinear regression models.

Functional polynomial regression models 
Functional polynomial regression models may be viewed as a natural extension of the Functional Linear Models (FLMs) with scalar responses, analogous to extending linear regression model  to polynomial regression model. In addition to the parameter function β that the above functional quadratic regression model shares with the FLM, it also features a parameter surface γ.

Functional single and multiple index models 

A functional multiple index model is given as below, with symbols having their usual meanings as formerly described,Here g represents an (unknown) general smooth function defined on a p-dimensional domain. The case   yields a functional single index model while multiple index models correspond to the case  . With  and relatively small sample sizes, the estimator given by this model often has large variance.

Functional additive models (FAMs) 

This constraint on the general smooth functions  ensures identifiability in the sense that the estimates of these additive component functions do not interfere with that of the intercept term . Another form of FAM is the continuously additive model, expressed as,for a bivariate smooth additive surface  which is required to satisfy  for all , in order to ensure identifiability.

Generalized functional linear model 
An obvious and direct extension of FLMs with scalar responses (see) is to add a link function leading to a generalized functional linear model (GFLM) in analogy to the generalized linear model (GLM). The three components of the GFLM are:

 Linear predictor ;  [systematic component]
 Variance function , where  is the conditional mean;  [random component]
 Link function  connecting the conditional mean  and the linear predictor  through .  [systematic component]

Clustering and classification of functional data 
For vector-valued multivariate data, k-means partitioning methods and hierarchical clustering are two main approaches. These classical clustering concepts for vector-valued multivariate data have been extended to functional data. For clustering of functional data, k-means clustering methods are more popular than hierarchical clustering methods. For k-means clustering on functional data, mean functions are usually regarded as the cluster centers. Covariance structures have also been taken into consideration. Besides k-means type clustering, functional clustering based on mixture models is also widely used in clustering vector-valued multivariate data and has been extended to functional data clustering. Furthermore, Bayesian hierarchical clustering also plays an important role in the development of model-based functional clustering. 

Functional classification assigns a group membership to a new data object either based on functional regression or functional discriminant analysis. Functional data classification methods based on functional regression models use class levels as responses and the observed functional data and other covariates as predictors. For regression based functional classification models, functional generalized linear models or more specifically, functional binary regression, such as functional logistic regression for binary responses, are commonly used classification approaches. More generally, the generalized functional linear regression model based on the FPCA approach is used. Functional Linear Discriminant Analysis (FLDA) has also been considered as a classification method for functional data. Functional data classification involving density ratios has also been proposed. A study of the asymptotic behavior of the proposed classifiers in the large sample limit shows that under certain conditions the misclassification rate converges to zero, a phenomenon that has been referred to as "perfect classification".

Time warping

Motivations 

In addition to amplitude variation, time variation may also be assumed to present in functional data. Time variation occurs when the subject-specific timing of certain events of interest varies among subjects. One classical example is the Berkeley Growth Study Data, where the amplitude variation is the growth rate and the time variation explains the difference in children's biological age at which the pubertal and the pre-pubertal growth spurt occurred. In the presence of time variation, the cross-sectional mean function may not be an efficient estimate as peaks and troughs are located randomly and thus meaningful signals may be distorted or hidden.

Time warping, also known as curve registration, curve alignment or time synchronization, aims to identify and separate amplitude variation and time variation. The time warping functions  are assumed to be invertible and to satisfy .

More general class of warping functions includes diffeomorphisms of the domain to itself, that is, loosely speaking, a class of invertible functions that maps the compact domain to itself such that both the function and its inverse are smooth. The set of linear transformation is contained in the set of diffeomorphisms. One challenge in time warping is identifiability of amplitude and phase variation. Specific assumptions are required to break this non-identifiability.

Methods 
Earlier approaches include dynamic time warping (DTW) used for applications such as speech recognition. Another traditional method for time warping is landmark registration, which aligns special features such as peak locations to an average location. Other relevant warping methods include pairwise warping, registration using   distance and elastic warping.

Dynamic time warping
The template function is determined through an iteration process, starting from cross-sectional mean, performing registration and recalculating the cross-sectional mean for the warped curves, expecting convergence after a few iterations. DTW minimizes a cost function through dynamic programming. Problems of non-smooth differentiable warps or greedy computation in DTW can be resolved by adding a regularization term to the cost function.

Landmark registration
Landmark registration (or feature alignment) assumes well-expressed features are present in all sample curves and uses the location of such features as a gold-standard. Special features such as peak or trough locations in functions or derivatives are aligned to their average locations on the template function. Then the warping function is introduced through a smooth transformation from the average location to the subject-specific locations. A problem of landmark registration is that the features may be missing or hard to identify due to the noise in the data.

Extensions 
So far we considered scalar valued stochastic process, defined on one dimensional time domain.

Multidimensional domain of  

Multivariate stochastic process 

Python packages 

There are Python packages to work with functional data, and its representation, perform exploratory analysis, or preprocessing, and among other tasks such as inference, classification, regression or clustering of functional data.

scikit-fda

R packages 

Some packages can handle functional data under both dense and longitudinal designs.

fda
refund 
fdapace
FDboost 
classiFunc 
fda.usc 
dtw 
fdasrvf

See also 
 Functional principal component analysis
 Karhunen–Loève theorem
 Modes of variation
 Functional regression
 Generalized functional linear model
 Stochastic processes
Lp space
Variance function

Further reading 

 Ramsay, J. O. and Silverman, B.W. (2005) Functional data analysis, 2nd ed., New York: Springer, 
 Horvath, L. and Kokoszka, P. (2012) Inference for Functional Data with Applications, New York: Springer,  
 Hsing, T. and Eubank, R. (2015) Theoretical Foundations of Functional Data Analysis, with an Introduction to Linear Operators, Wiley series in probability and statistics, John Wiley & Sons, Ltd, 
 Morris, J. (2015) Functional Regression, Annual Review of Statistics and Its Application, Vol. 2, 321 - 359, https://doi.org/10.1146/annurev-statistics-010814-020413
 Wang et al. (2016) Functional Data Analysis, Annual Review of Statistics and Its Application, Vol. 3, 257-295, https://doi.org/10.1146/annurev-statistics-041715-033624
:Category:Regression analysis

References

Statistical data types
Statistical analysis